Microdevario gatesi is a species of cyprinid found in southeast Asian rivers and streams. It belongs to the genus Microdevario, which contains small danionins. It is endemic to the lower Irrawaddy River drainage in south central Myanmar.

References

Fish described in 1939
Taxa named by Albert William Herre
Danios
Microdevario
Fish of Myanmar